Malyon is an English surname. Notable people with the surname include:

 Ed Malyon, British journalist
 Eily Malyon (1879–1961), English actress

References 

English-language surnames